The World Soundtrack Award for Best Original Song Written Directly for a Film is one of the three main prizes given by the World Soundtrack Academy to honour the best movie soundtracks. It has been given out each year since the Awards' debut in 2001.

"†" means that the song won the Academy Award for Best Original Song.

Winners and nominees

 2001: Moulin Rouge!, for the song "Come What May" – David Baerwald
 Artificial Intelligence: A.I., for the song "For Always" – John Williams & Cynthia Weil
 Atlantis: The Lost Empire, for the song "Where the Dream Takes You" – Dianne Warren & James Newton Howard
 Azzurro, for the song "Quante Cose Chiare" – Louis Crelier & Lucia Albertoni
 Felicidades, for the song "Soy un Angelito" – Daniel Tarrab & Andrés Goldstein
 2002: Monsters, Inc., for the song "If I Didn't Have You" – Randy Newman, Billy Crystal & John Goodman †
 Final Fantasy: The Spirits Within, for the song "The Dream Within" – Elliot Goldenthal, Dick Rudolph & Lara Fabian
 Kate & Leopold, for the song "Until" – Sting
 Spirit: Stallion of the Cimarron, for the song "This is Where I Belong" – Hans Zimmer, Bryan Adams & R.J. Lange
 Spirit: Stallion of the Cimarron, for the song "Here I Am" – Hans Zimmer, Bryan Adams & Gretchen Peters
 2003: Gangs of New York, for the song "The Hands That Built America" – Adam Clayton, The Edge, Bono & Larry Mullen, Jr.
 8 Mile, for the song "Lose Yourself" – Jeff Bass, Luis Resto & Eminem †
 Frida, for the song "Burn It Blue" – Elliot Goldenthal, Julie Taymor, Caetano Veloso & Lila Downs
 The Jungle Book 2, for the song "Jungle Rhythm" – Paul Grabowsky, Lorraine Feather, Haley Joel Osment, Mae Whitman & Connor Funk
 The Lord of the Rings: The Two Towers, for the song "Gollum's Song" – Howard Shore, Fran Walsh, Janet Roddick, David Donaldson, Steve Roche, David Long & Emiliana Torrini
 The Quiet American, for the song "Nothing In This World" – Craig Armstrong & Hong Nhung
 2004: Cold Mountain, for the song "You Will Be My Ain True Love" – Sting & Alison Krauss
 Big Fish, for the song "Man of the Hour" – Eddie Vedder & Pearl Jam
 The Lord of the Rings: The Return of the King, for the song "Into the West" – Annie Lennox, Howard Shore & Fran Walsh †
 Shrek 2, for the song "Accidentally in Love" – Adam Duritz, Dan Vickrey, David Immerglück, David Bryson, Matthew Malley & Counting Crows
 Troy, for the song "Remember Me" – James Horner, Cynthia Weil, Josh Groban & Tanja Tzarovska
 2005: Alfie, for the song "Old Habits Die Hard" – David A. Stewart & Mick Jagger
 Diarios de motocicleta, for the song "Al otro lado del río" – Jorge Drexler †
 Hotel Rwanda, for the song "Million Voices" – Wyclef Jean, Jerry 'Wonder' Duplessis & Andrea Guerra
 The Phantom of the Opera, for the song "Learn to Be Lonely" – Andrew Lloyd Webber, Charles Hart & Minnie Driver
 The Polar Express, for the song "Believe" – Alan Silvestri, Glen Ballard & Josh Groban
 2006: Cars, for the song "Our Town" – Randy Newman & James Taylor
 Brokeback Mountain, for the song "A Love That Will Never Grow Old" – Gustavo Santaolalla, Bernie Taupin & Emmylou Harris
 The Chronicles of Narnia: The Lion, The Witch and The Wardrobe, for the song "Can't Take It In" – Harry Gregson-Williams & Imogen Heap
 Harry Potter and the Goblet of Fire, for the song "Magic Works" – Jarvis Cocker, Jonny Greenwood, Phil Selway, Steve Mackey, Steve Claydon, Jason Buckle & Patrick Doyle
 Tsotsi, for the song "Mdlwembe" – Kabelo 'Kaybee' Ikaneng & Zola
 2007: Casino Royale, for the song "You Know My Name" – Chris Cornell & David Arnold
 An Inconvenient Truth, for the song "I Need to Wake Up" – Melissa Etheridge †
 Miss Potter, for the song "When You Taught Me How To Dance" – Mike Batt, Nigel Westlake, Richard Maltby Jr. & Katie Melua
 Once, for the song "Falling Slowly" – Glen Hansard & Markéta Irglová †
 Ratatouille, for the song "Le Festin" – Michael Giacchino & Camille
 2008:WALL-E, for the song "Down to Earth" – Peter Gabriel & Thomas Newman
 American Gangster, for the song "Do You Feel Me" – Diane Warren & Anthony Hamilton
 Beowulf, for the song "A Hero Comes Home" – Glen Ballard, Alan Silvestri, Robin Wright Penn & Idina Menzel
 Into the Wild, for the song "Guaranteed" – Eddie Vedder
 Love in the Time of Cholera, for the song "Despedida" – Antonio Pinto & Shakira
 2009: Slumdog Millionaire, for the song "Jai Ho" – A. R. Rahman, Gulzar & Tanvi Shah †
 Gran Torino, for the song "Gran Torino" – Jamie Cullum, Clint Eastwood, Kyle Eastwood & Michael Stevens
 Je l'aimais, for the song "Run & Hide" – Anna Chalon
 Slumdog Millionaire, for the song "O... Saya" – A. R. Rahman & Mathangi Arulpragasam
 The Wrestler, for the song "The Wrestler" – Bruce Springsteen
 2010: Crazy Heart, for the song "The Weary Kind" – Ryan Bingham & T-Bone Burnett †
 The Princess and the Frog, for the song "Almost There" – Randy Newman
 Avatar, for the song "I See You" – James Horner, Simon Franglen & Kuk Harrell
 Everybody's Fine, for the song "(I Want to) Come Home" – Paul McCartney
 How to Train Your Dragon, for the song "Sticks & Stones" – Jon Birgisson
 2011: Toy Story 3, for the song "We Belong Together" - Randy Newman †
 Country Strong, for the song "Coming Home" - Tom Douglas, Hillary Lindsey, Troy Verges, Bob DiPiero and Gwyneth Paltrow
 127 Hours, for the song "If I Rise" - Rollo Armstrong, Dido and A. R. Rahman
 Tangled, for the song "I See the Light" - Alan Menken, Glenn Slater, Mandy Moore and Zachary Levi
 Burlesque, for the song "You Haven't Seen the Last of Me" - Diane Warren and Cher
 2012: Albert Nobbs, for the song "Lay Your Head Down" - Brian Byrne and Glenn Close
 The Help, for the song "The Living Proof" - Thomas Newman, Mary J. Blige, Harvey Mason, Jr. and Damon Thomas
 The Muppets, for the song "Man or Muppet" - Bret McKenzie †
 Snow White and the Huntsman, for the song "Breath of Life" - Florence Welch and Isabella Summers
 W.E., for the song "Masterpiece" - Madonna, Julie Frost and Jimmy Harry
 2013: Skyfall, for the song "Skyfall" - Adele and Paul Epworth †
 Beasts of the Southern Wild, for the song "The Bathtub" - Dan Romer and Benh Zeitlin
 The Great Gatsby, for the song "Young and Beautiful" - Lana Del Rey and Rick Nowels
 Life of Pi, for the song "Pi's Lullaby" - Mychael Danna and Bombay Jayashri
 Oblivion, for the song "Oblivion" - Anthony Gonzalez and Susanne Sundfør
 2014: Despicable Me 2, for the song "Happy" - Pharrell Williams
 All Is Lost, for the song "Amen" - Alex Ebert
 Frozen, for the song "Let It Go" - Kristen Anderson-Lopez and Robert Lopez †
 Her, for the song "The Moon Song" - Karen O and Spike Jonze
 Mandela: Long Walk to Freedom, for the song "Ordinary Love" - Bono
 2015: The Book of Life, for the song "The Apology Song" - Gustavo Santaolalla and Paul Williams
 Beyond the Lights, for the song "Grateful" - Diane Warren
 The Divergent Series: Insurgent, for the song "Carry Me Home" - Joseph Trapanese and Christopher Taylor
 Lost River, for the song "Tell Me" - Johnny Jewel 
 Selma, for the song "Glory" - John Legend, Common and Rhymefest †
 2016: Anomalisa, for the song "None of Them Are You" - Carter Burwell and Charlie Kaufman
 Jenny's Wedding, for the song "True Love Avenue" - Brian Byrne and Kasey Jones
 Kahlil Gibran's The Prophet, for the song "Hypnosis" - Damien Rice
 The Peanuts Movie, for the song "Better When I'm Dancin'" - Meghan Trainor and Thaddeus Dixon
 Spectre, for the song "Writing's on the Wall" - Sam Smith and Jimmy Napes †
 2017: La La Land, for the song "City of Stars" - Justin Hurwitz, Benj Pasek and Justin Paul †
 Hidden Figures, for the song "Runnin’" - Pharrell Williams
 Lion, for the song "Never Give Up" - Sia Furler and Greg Kurstin
 Moana, for the song "How Far I'll Go" - Lin-Manuel Miranda
Trolls, for the song "Can't Stop the Feeling!" - Justin Timberlake, Max Martin and Shellback
 2018: Black Panther, for the song "Black Panther" - Kendrick Duckworth, Mark Spears, Kevin Gomringer, Tim Gomringer and Matt Schaeffer
 Murder on the Orient Express, for the song "Never Forget" - Patrick Doyle and Kenneth Branagh
 Coco, for the song "Remember Me" - Kristen Anderson-Lopez and Robert Lopez †
 Marshall, for the song "Stand Up for Something" - Diane Warren and Common 
 The Greatest Showman, for the song "This Is Me" - Benj Pasek and Justin Paul
 2019: A Star is Born, for the song "Shallow" - Lady Gaga, Andrew Wyatt, Anthony Rossomando, Mark Ronson, Bradley Cooper †
 A Private War, for the song "Requiem for a Private War" - Annie Lennox
 Spider-Man: Into the Spider-Verse, for the song "Sunflower" - Swae Lee (as Khalif Brown), Louis Bell, Post Malone (as Austin Post), Billy Walsh (as William Walsh), Carter Lang, Carl Rosen
 Mary Poppins Returns, for the song "The Place Where Lost Things Go" - Marc Shaiman, Scott Wittman, Emily Blunt
 The Ballad of Buster Scruggs, for the song "When a Cowboy Trades His Spurs for Wings" - David Rawlings, Gillian Welch, Willie Watson, Tim Blake Nelson
 2020: Harriet, for the song "Stand Up" - Joshuah Brian Campbell, Cynthia Erivo
 Toy Story 4, for the song "I Can't Let You Throw Yourself Away" - Randy Newman
 Rocketman, for the song "(I'm Gonna) Love Me Again" - Elton John, Bernie Taupin, Taron Egerton †
 Frozen II, for the song "Into the Unknown" - Kristen Anderson-Lopez, Robert Lopez, Idina Menzel, Aurora
 Bombshell, for the song "One Little Soldier" - Regina Spektor
 2021: Cruella, for the song "Call Me Cruella" from Disney's Cruella (by Nicholas Britell, Florence Welch, Steph Jones, Jordan Powers & Taura Stinson)
 Eurovision Song Contest: The Story of Fire Saga, for the song "Husavik" - Savan Kotecha, Rickard Göransson and Max Grahn 
 Judas and the Black Messiah, for the song "Fight for You" – H.E.R., D'Mile, and Tiara Thomas †
 Minari for "Rain Song" – Emile Mosseri 
 Mulan, for the song "Loyal Brave True" – Harry Gregson-Williams, Jamie Hartman, Rosi Golan and Billy Grabtree
 The Trial of the Chicago 7, for the song "Hear My Voice" – Daniel Pemberton and Celeste Waite
 2022: No Time to Die, for the song "No Time to Die" - Billie Eilish and Finneas O'Connell †
 Don't Look Up, for the song "Just Look Up" – Nicholas Brittell, Kid Cudi, Ariana Grande and Taura Stinson
 Encanto, for the song "We Don't Talk About Bruno" – Lin-Manuel Miranda
 The Green Knight, for the song "Blome Swete Lilie Flour" – Daniel Hart
 Slow Horses, for the song "Strange World" – Daniel Pemberton and Mick Jagger
 Top Gun Maverick, for the song "Hold My Hand" – BloodPop and Lady Gaga

External links
 World Soundtrack Awards at IMDb

World Soundtrack Awards
Film awards for Best Song